The Dangerous Drugs Act 1952, is a Malaysian law which was enacted to make further and better provision for the regulation of the importation, exportation, manufacture, sale, and use of opium and certain other dangerous drugs and substances, to make special provision relating to the jurisdiction of courts in respect of offences thereunder and their trial, and for purposes connected therewith.

Structure
The Dangerous Drugs Act 1952, in its current form (1 January 2006), consists of 6 Parts containing 50 sections and 3 schedules (including 47 amendments).
 Part I: Interpretation and Definitions
 Part II: Control of Raw Opium, Coca leaves, Poppy straw and Cannabis
 Part III: Control of Prepared Opium, Cannabis and Cannabis Resin
 Part IV: Control of Certain Dangerous Drugs
 Part V: Control of External Trade
 Part VI: Ancillary and General Provisions
 Schedules

References

External links
 Dangerous Drugs Act 1952 
 http://kl98.thecgf.com/athletes/drugs.html

1952 in Malaya
Legal history of British Malaya
1952 in law
Malaysian federal legislation
Drugs in Malaysia